was a Japanese samurai of the late Sengoku through early Edo periods. Founder of the Watari-Date clan. A senior retainer of the Date clan of Sendai, he was a cousin of Date Masamune on his mother's side, and a cousin of Masamune's father Date Terumune on his father's side. Together with Oniniwa Tsunamoto and Katakura Kagetsuna, Shigezane was known as one of the "Three Great Men of the Date Clan". 

Shigezane was a son of Date Sanemoto and was at first known as Tôgorô. He was fought at Battle of Hitotoribashi in 1586 and Battle of Suriagehara in 1589, and well known for his fighting skill.

After distinguishing himself at the Battle of Hitadori (1586) he was given Nihonmatsu castle and an income of 38,000 koku. He played an active role in the defeat of the Ashina clan in 1589. 

In 1595, after the first Korean campaign, he suddenly retired at Mount Koya, but re-entered Masamune's service in 1600 and later went on to fight at Osaka Campaign in 1614 - 1615. He later produced a written work on the Date family.

Notes

1568 births
1646 deaths
Samurai
Date clan